Coco3 can refer to:
Cobalt(II) carbonate, an inorganic compound with the formula CoCO3
The third and final version of the TRS-80 Color Computer, a 6809-based home computer launched by Radio Shack